Damianpu is a station on Line 2 of the Chengdu Metro in China.

Station layout

References

Railway stations in Sichuan
Railway stations in China opened in 2014
Chengdu Metro stations